The Singles: 1996–2006 is a compilation album by the American rock band Staind, which was released through their current record label Atlantic Records in the UK on November 13, 2006, and in the US on November 14, 2006. A companion DVD, called Staind: The Videos, was released on the same date.

Track listing

Notes
 Despite being singles, "Suffocate", "Just Go", "Fade", "How About You" and "King of All Excuses" did not make the tracklist.
 "Sober" (live at the Hiro Ballroom) has slightly different lyrics than Tool in the chorus.

Charts

References

Staind compilation albums
2006 compilation albums
Flip Records (1994) albums